A badminton tournament was held at the  1995 Southeast Asian Games in Chiang Mai.

Medalists

Results

Men's singles

Women's singles

Men's doubles

Women's doubles

Mixed doubles

Medal tally

References
Medal Tally
History of the SEA Games
Tournament link

Badminton
Southeast Asian Games
Multi-sport events, Southeast Asian Games